Tiana Penitani (born 12 January 1996) is an Australian rugby league footballer who plays for the Parramatta Eels in the NRL Women's Premiership and the Cronulla-Sutherland Sharks in the NSWRL Women's Premiership.

She previously represented Australia in rugby sevens.

Background
Born in Canberra, Penitani played junior rugby league for La Perouse United before switching to rugby union and Oztag. She is of Tongan descent.

Playing career

Rugby union
In 2014, Penitani, along with Brooke Anderson, captained Australia to the Gold medal at the 2014 Summer Youth Olympics, held in China. This was the first time Rugby Sevens had been part of the Olympic programme since 1924. The tournament was Penitani's first in 14 months, following a serious knee injury sustained at the 2013 Rugby World Cup Sevens. At 17 years and 163 days old, she became Australia's youngest ever representative in either 15s or 7s at a World Cup, when she represented Australia in Russia.

In 2019, Penitani was on the award voting panels for both the World Rugby Men's Sevens Player of the Year and the World Rugby Women's Sevens Player of the Year.

Rugby league
In 2019, Penitani returned to rugby league, joining the Cronulla-Sutherland Sharks NSWRL Women's Premiership team. In May 2019, she represented NSW City at the Women's National Championships.

On 14 June 2019, she signed with the St George Illawarra Dragons NRL Women's Premiership team.

In Round 1 of the 2019 NRL Women's season, Penitani made her debut for the Dragons in a 4–14 loss to the Brisbane Broncos.

In October 2019, she represented Australia at the 2019 Rugby League World Cup 9s, scoring five tries and finishing as the tournament's top try scorer. On 25 October 2019, she made her Test debut for Australia in a 28–8 win over New Zealand.

References

External links
St George Illawarra Dragons profile

1996 births
Living people
Australian sportspeople of Tongan descent
Australian female rugby union players
Australian female rugby sevens players
Australia international rugby sevens players
Rugby sevens players at the 2014 Summer Youth Olympics
Australian female rugby league players
Sportswomen from the Australian Capital Territory
Australia women's national rugby league team players
St. George Illawarra Dragons (NRLW) players
Rugby league centres
Youth Olympic gold medalists for Australia